This is a list of Spanish television related events in 1993.

Events 
 28 January: Journalist Nieves Herrero (in the reality show De tú a tú in Antena 3), interviews the parents of the murdered girls in the Alcácer Case the very same day their bodies are found, which unleashes a strong controversy and opens a debate on the limits of journalistic ethics.
 24 May: First presidential debate in Spanish History between  Felipe González and José María Aznar, in Antena 3, moderated by Manuel Campo Vidal.
 31 May: Second presidential debate in Spanish History between  Felipe González and José María Aznar, in Telecinco, moderated by Luis Mariñas. Next debate of this kind will take place after 15 years, in 2008.
 9 October: Ana Reverte, representing Spain, wins the Festival de la OTI, with the song Enamorarse.

Debuts

Television shows

Ending this year

Changes of network affiliation

Foreign series debuts in Spain

Births 
 19 January - Jesús Castro, actor.
 20 January - Alexia Rivas, pundit.
 21 July - Santiago Crespo, actor

Deaths 
 12 June - Manuel Summers, director y guionista, 57.
 4 July - Lola Gaos, actress, 71.

See also
1993 in Spain
List of Spanish films of 1993

References 

1993 in Spanish television